Bayburtlu Kara Ibrahim Pasha ("Ibrahim Pasha the Courageous of Bayburt") was an Ottoman statesman. He was Grand Vizier of the Ottoman Empire from 25 December 1683 to 18 November 1685. He was also the Ottoman governor of Egypt from 1669 to 1673. He was of Turkish origin

See also
 List of Ottoman Grand Viziers
 List of Ottoman governors of Egypt

References

17th-century Grand Viziers of the Ottoman Empire
17th-century Ottoman governors of Egypt
Ottoman governors of Egypt
Turks from the Ottoman Empire